Yevhen Viktorovych Korokhov (born 17 March 1998) is a Ukrainian professional footballer who plays as a right-back for Ukrainian club Obolon Kyiv.

References

External links
 Profile on Podillya Khmelnytskyi official website 
 
 

1998 births
Living people
Footballers from Zaporizhzhia
Ukrainian footballers
Ukraine youth international footballers
Association football defenders
FC Metalurh Zaporizhzhia players
FC Shakhtar Donetsk players
FC Zorya Luhansk players
FC Tavria-Skif Rozdol players
FC Arsenal Kyiv players
FC Polissya Zhytomyr players
FC Podillya Khmelnytskyi players
Legionovia Legionowo players
FC Obolon-Brovar Kyiv players
Ukrainian First League players
Ukrainian Second League players
Ukrainian Amateur Football Championship players
Ukrainian expatriate footballers
Expatriate footballers in Poland
Ukrainian expatriate sportspeople in Poland